Seay is a surname. Notable people with the surname include:

 Abraham Jefferson Seay
 Albert Seay, American musicologist
 Bobby Seay
 Clarence Seay
 Dick Seay
 Edward T. Seay (c. 1869-1941), American lawyer and politician
 Frank Howell Seay
 James Seay, (1914-1992), American actor
 Johnny Seay
 Lloyd Seay
 Mark Seay
 SEAY, vocalist/compsoer 
 S.S. Seay
 Thomas Seay
 Virgil Seay
 Virginia Seay
 William W. Seay

See also
 Johnny Sea (born John Allan Seay, Jr.)
 Robbie Seay Band
 Seay Building, the main administration building of Centenary College of New Jersey
 Seay Hall at the Alabama Agricultural and Mechanical University
 Seay Auditorium, at the University of Kentucky, Lexington (named after William Albert Seay, Dean of the College of Agriculture in the 1960s)
USNS Seay, a U.S. Navy cargo ship
Say (disambiguation)
Sea (disambiguation)
See (disambiguation)
Shea (disambiguation)